Clewer South is an electoral ward comprising part of Windsor, Berkshire. It is represented by Ed Wilson and Michael Airey of the Conservative Party in the Royal Borough of Windsor and Maidenhead. Nationally, the ward forms part of the UK Parliamentary constituency of Windsor and is represented by Adam Afriyie of the Conservative Party.

As of 1 December 2011, there are 3,796 voters appearing on the electoral roll for the ward.

Polling stations

There are two polling stations within the ward, with one being located at the Tinkers Lane Depot in Dedworth and the other at Leslie Dunne House on Fuzzens Walk.

Royal Borough representation

Royal Borough elections are held every four years.

Past election results

References

See also
Elections in the United Kingdom

Wards of the Royal Borough of Windsor and Maidenhead